is a railway station on the West Japan Railway Company Kansai Line (Yamatoji Line) in Higashisumiyoshi-ku, Osaka, Osaka Prefecture, Japan.

Layout
Tōbu-shijō-mae Station has two side platforms serving two elevated tracks.  There is a difficulty of locating elevators (lifts) and escalators for the station structure.

Surroundings
Osaka Municipal Central Wholesale Markets East Wholesale Market
JR Freight Kudara Kamotsu Terminal
Kumata Junction (Japan National Route 25 and Imazato-suji)

Bus stops
Kumata (Osaka Municipal Transportation Bureau)
Kudara-ekimae Junction (along Imazato-suji)
Route 35 for Moriguchi Shako-mae via Subway Imazato
Route 35B for 
Route 85 for Namba via Subway Imazato and 
West side of Kumata Junction
Route 1 for  via Hirano-Miyamachi Nichome and Kire-Higashiguchi
Route 30 for Hirano Kuyakusho-mae via JR Hirano-eki and Subway Hirano
Route 1 and Route 5 for  via Naka-Kuwazu
Route 30 for Abenobashi via 
East side of Kumata Junction
Route 1 for Deto Bus Terminal via Hirano-Miyamachi Nichome and Kire-Higashiguchi
Route 1 for Abenobashi via Naka-Kuwazu
South-west side of Kumata Junction
Route 6 for Sunjiyata
Route 6 and Route 26 for Abenobashi via 
South side of Kumata Junction
Route 5 for Miyake-naka
Route 6 for Sunjiyata
Route 73 for Deto Bus Terminal via Imagawa Hatchome and Hirano Sports Center
Route 5 for  via Naka-Kuwazu
Route 73 for Namba via Katsuyama Yonchome and

History 
Tōbu-shijō-mae Station opened on 11 November 1989.

Station numbering was introduced in March 2018 with Kami being assigned station number JR-Q21.

Adjacent stations

References 

Higashisumiyoshi-ku, Osaka
Railway stations in Osaka
Railway stations in Japan opened in 1989